Allo Darlin' are an indie pop band based in London. Their self-titled debut album was released on the Fortuna Pop! label in 2010, with a second album, Europe, appearing in 2012. A third album, We Come from the Same Place, was released in autumn 2014.

History

Allo Darlin' was started as a solo project by Australian singer and songwriter Elizabeth Morris whilst living in London, England. The band name came from her time working in Soho. "I used to work near the market sellers," she said. "Every day I'd walk past and the old guys would yell out "Allo darlin'" as they ashed into their fruit bowls."

In early 2009, a full band lineup of Allo Darlin' formed with guitarist Paul Rains, drummer Michael Collins and bassist Bill Botting. They released their first single, "Henry Rollins Don't Dance", on WeePOP! Records that summer.

That year Fortuna Pop! signed the band, and they released two singles, "The Polaroid Song" (2009) and "Dreaming" (2010), before the band's self-titled debut full-length, produced by Simon Trought, was released by the label in the summer of 2010.
 
In 2011 Allo Darlin' self-released the "Darren"/"The Wu-Tang Clan" single. The band returned with new album Europe in spring of 2012, released again by Fortuna Pop in the UK and this time by Slumberland in the US.

They spent the next year touring before heading back into the studio to record their third album. We Come from the Same Place was released in October 2014. The band went their separate ways at the end of 2016.

In January 2023, the band announced on social media that they have reunited for a few gigs in England, their first in six years, with a possibility of recording new music together.

Discography

Albums
Allo Darlin' (Fortuna Pop!, 2010)
Europe (Fortuna Pop!/Slumberland, 2012)
We Come from the Same Place (Fortuna Pop!/Slumberland, 2014)

Singles
"Henry Rollins Don't Dance" (WeePOP!, 2009)
"The Polaroid Song" (Fortuna Pop!, 2009)
"Dreaming" (Fortuna Pop!, 2010)
"My Heart Is A Drummer" (Fortuna Pop!, 2010)
"If Loneliness Was Art" (Fortuna Pop!, 2010)
"Darren" / "Wu Tang Clan" (Self-release, 2011)
"Capricornia" (Fortuna Pop!/Slumberland, 2012)
"Northern Lights" (Fortuna Pop!/Slumberland, 2012)
"Europe" (Fortuna Pop!/Slumberland, 2012)
"Only Dust Behind" (WIAWIYA, 2012)
"Bright Eyes" (Fortuna Pop!/Slumberland, 2014)
"Half Heart Necklace" (Fortuna Pop!/Slumberland, 2015)
"Kings and Queens" (Fortuna Pop!/Slumberland, 2015)
"Hymn on the 45" (Fortuna Pop!/Hangover Lounge, 2016)

References

External links
Official website

British indie pop groups
Musical groups established in 2008
2008 establishments in England
2016 disestablishments in England
Musical groups disestablished in 2016
Musical quartets